Craig Caldwell (born 20 January 1973) is a New Zealand professional darts player who competes in Professional Darts Corporation (PDC) tournaments. His major sponsors are SHOT, L-Style and Clearview Windows Limited.

Career

Caldwell topped the New Zealand regional table in the 2014/15 season to win a place in the preliminary round of the 2016 BDO World Darts Championship. He previously appeared in televised tournaments in the PDC, competing in the PDC World Cup of Darts in 2013 and 2014, as well as the Auckland Darts Masters, Perth and Sydney Darts masters in 2015. In his World Championship debut he defeated Alan Soutar with a respectable 90 average and also went six darts into a perfect leg. Caldwell hit nine 180's in a first round match at the Lakeside World Championships in 2016, which equaled the current record. Caldwell won the inaugural televised New Zealand national  Super league in 2015. Caldwell is the only player to hit a 9 dart finish in a New Zealand ranking event in 2015.

World Championship results

BDO

 2016: 1st Round (lost to Scott Mitchell 2–3) (sets)
 2017: Preliminary Round (lost to Dennis Harbour 1–3)
 2018: Preliminary Round (lost to Daniel Day 0–3)

References

External links
 Craig Caldwell on Darts Database

Living people
New Zealand darts players
British Darts Organisation players
1973 births
Professional Darts Corporation associate players
PDC World Cup of Darts team New Zealand